Lansdowne School is a special needs secondary school in Argyll Close, Stockwell, south London.

The school caters to children with mixed needs, and children who have social and communication challenges alongside their learning difficulties.

The school became subject to special measures following an Ofsted inspection in February 2012. A follow-up inspection in June 2012 found that progress since then had been satisfactory. The school is graded 'Good' as of its most recent inspection in November 2016.

References

External links
 Official Website
 Original Website
 School Profile on Edubase
 Ofsted reports for Lansdowne School

Special secondary schools in England
Special schools in the London Borough of Lambeth
Community schools in the London Borough of Lambeth